Homovanillyl alcohol is a metabolite of hydroxytyrosol, which in turn is a metabolite of the neurotransmitter dopamine.

See also 
 Homovanillic acid

References 

O-methylated phenylpropanoids
Vanilloids